The 1994 North American cold wave occurred over the midwestern and eastern regions of the United States and southern Canada in January 1994. The cold wave caused over 100 deaths in the United States. Two notable cold air events took place from January 18–19 and January 21–22. There were 67 minimum temperature records set on January 19.  During this time, much of the United States experienced its coldest temperatures since February 1934.

Meteorological synopsis 

Cold air outbreaks are characterized by strong upper-level troughs in the atmosphere, with ridges usually located up and downstream.  On January 17, the 500 millibar (mb) height contours showed the low-pressure center was situated near the border of Ontario and Manitoba, just north of Minnesota, with the trough axis stretching down into the Upper Midwest.  The 500 mb height contours on January 18, 1994, showed the strong trough over the Great Lakes region extending southward that brought cold air down from the North Pole. MERRA-2 reanalysis detailed the cold air funneling into the Upper Midwest from Canada on January 18, with strong winds out of the northwest. The surface analysis map on January 18 showed a low-level ridge over the Upper Midwest and surface winds blowing out of the northwest. The surface anticyclones on January 18 and 21 both exceeded 1040 mb and moved to the southeast, bringing cold air to much of the eastern half of the United States. By January 19, the upper levels showed a retreat of the low-pressure center, however, shortwave troughs were still located near the United States, and surface temperature effects with the strong anticyclone were felt for days to come.

Snow was associated with this cold weather in many regions. From January 17–18, a snowstorm affected areas from the Ozarks to New England. Ice affected most of the Mid-Atlantic region. A new single-storm record was broken in Louisville, Kentucky, with 16 inches of snowfall recorded, while accumulations of sleet and freezing rain in New York City were in excess of an inch.

United States weather records 

On January 16, the Watertown, New York International Airport set an all-time record low of -43°F (-41.7°C).

Indiana and Kentucky both set state records on January 19.

The city of Watertown, New York, observed its coldest January on record (since 1893), with a mean temperature of 5.39°F (-14.78°C).

Syracuse, New York's Hancock International Airport recorded a monthly mean temperature of 12.6°F (-10.8°C), a record low for January.

Erie, Pennsylvania, hit , which at the time was a record.

January 19, 1994. However, the arctic blast lasted for three days from January 18 to 20.

On January 6–7, 1994, Lake County, Minnesota, set records for the largest snow in one day as well as the most snow in one storm.

Maine had its coldest month since February 1934 and its coldest January since 1920, while Vermont had its coldest winter since 1958–1959 and the adjacent states of New Hampshire and Maine their coldest since 1976–1977 and 1970–1971, respectively.

Minneapolis–Saint Paul was one of the areas that felt major impacts from the cold wave. From 3 PM CST on January 13 to 1 PM CST on January 19, the temperature recorded at Minneapolis–Saint Paul International Airport stayed at or below zero, marking 142 continuous hours. This was the sixth-longest stretch on record from 1873–2014.

Almost all primary and secondary schools in Chicago were closed that day. Richard Daley, then mayor of Chicago advised residents not to go outside if they don't have to. Nearly all schools in the area were closed and four people in Cook County, Illinois, died from hypothermia. Hundreds of drivers per hour complained to the AAA-Chicago Motor Club about dead automobile batteries, fuel injectors being too cold and other vehicle issues and United Airlines canceled almost half of its flights. Multiple complaints were raised about lack of power due to severed electricity lines and water companies stopped water supply to homes due to pipe explosions. Many apartment renters complained to Cook County about insufficient heat.

Canada weather records 
January was also a month of extremes in Canada. Temperatures in the Yukon almost reached .

The cold air was also accompanied by large snowfalls. The western side of Lake Ontario saw . Rapid melting and freezing near the end of January closed Toronto Pearson International Airport on January 30 for the first time in 60 years. Water shortages were also common in Goose Bay due to extreme temperatures.

References 

1994 cold waves
Cold waves in Canada
North American Cold Wave, 1994
Cold waves in the United States
1994 natural disasters in the United States
1994 disasters in Canada
1994 in Ontario
1994 in British Columbia